La última pieza is a 2021 short film directed by Venezuelan filmmaker Ricardo Muñoz Senior. The film is a dystopian fiction that is inspired and satirizes Latin American socialist governments.

Plot 
A working-class man must face a hostile and indifferent bureaucracy in order to finish a puzzle game.

Cast 

 Ricardo Muñoz Senior as Albertini
 Samantha Castillo as the Madam Commissioner
 Victor Oliveira as the General
 Franco Tintori as the Cashier
 Gabriel Atala Garay as the Soldier
 Laura de Freitas as the Public Official 2

Reception 
The film was the only Venezuelan and Latin American short in the official selection of the 39th Torino Film Festival in 2021. It was also awarded as the Best Foreign Film at the 2021 Victory International Film Festival 2021, as well as Best Short Film Screenplay and Special Jury Mention at the 13th Seattle Latino Film Festival. The film was set to be premiered from 28 to 31 January 2022 at the 16th National and International  "Manuel Trujillo Durán" Short Film Festival in Venezuela, held in the Zulia state.

See also 

 Pink tide

References

External links 

 LA ÚLTIMA PIEZA Torino Film Festival
 

2021 films
2020s Spanish-language films
Venezuelan short films
Political satire films
2020s satirical films
2021 drama films
2021 comedy films